Strive Masiyiwa (born 29 January 1961) is a London-based Zimbabwean billionaire businessman and philanthropist. He is the founder and executive chairman of international technology groups Econet Global and Cassava Technologies.

Masiyiwa has provided scholarships to more than 250,000 young Africans over the past 20 years through his family foundation. He has supported more than 40,000 orphans with educational initiatives and sponsored students at universities in America, the United Kingdom, and China.

Early life and education 

Strive Masiyiwa was born in Zimbabwe, on 29 January 1961. When he was seven, his family left the country after Prime Minister Ian Smith's government declared a Unilateral Declaration of Independence from the United Kingdom. The family settled in Kitwe, a city in north central Zambia known for its copper mines. It was here that he attended primary school, before completing his secondary education in Scotland. Masiyiwa's mother was an entrepreneur. By the time Masiyiwa was 12 years old, his parents could afford to provide him with a European education.

They sent him to private school in Edinburgh, Scotland. When he graduated in 1978, he travelled back to Rhodesia, intending to join Robert Mugabe and Joshua Nkomo's anti-government guerrilla forces. However, he returned to school in Britain, and earned a degree in electrical engineering from the University of Wales in 1983. He worked briefly in the computer industry in Cambridge, England, but returned to Zimbabwe in 1984, hoping to aid the country's recovery following the end of the Rhodesian Bush War and universal franchise elections in 1980.

Global influence 

Masiyiwa's international appointments and board memberships over the years include: Unilever (board member), Netflix (board member), Bill & Melinda Gates Foundation (trustee), the National Geographic Society (trustee), Bank of America (Global Advisory Council), UN Commission on Adaptation (former Commissioner), Generation Africa (co-founder), Pathways for Prosperity Commission on Technology and Inclusive Development (co-chair), The Rockefeller Foundation (former board member), US Council on Foreign Relations (Global Advisory Board), the Asia Society (former board member), Stanford University (Global Advisory Board), the Africa Progress Panel, Alliance for a Green Revolution in Africa (chair, now Chair Emeritus), The Micronutrient Initiative of Canada (former board member), Grow Africa, the African Union's Ebola Fund (co-founder), Morehouse College(former Trustee), the African Academy of Sciences (Honorary Fellow) and the Pan African Strategic Institute. He was recently involved in helping to organize the Global Africa Business Initiative launched in New York in 2022.

Masiyiwa is the only African member of the United States Holocaust Memorial Museum's Committee on Conscience. Masiyiwa also served on two UN Advisory Panels.

Leadership and international accolades 

In 2011, The Times of London named him one of the 25 Leaders of Africa's Renaissance Award.

In 2014, Fortune Magazine named Masiyiwa one of the 50 most influential business leaders in the world, and he was cited as one of the Top 100 most influential Africans by New African magazine.

In September 2014, the Chair of the African Union (AU), Nkosazana Dlamini-Zuma, asked Masiyiwa to help mobilise resources for Africa's response to the Ebola outbreak. This was the first time The AU had asked a business leader to undertake such a role. Masiyiwa, with the help of other leaders, set up the first ever Pan-African fund-raising campaign known as #AfricaAgainstEbola Solidarity Fund.

The fund raised millions of US dollars from the public using SMS donations, with contributions coming from many African countries. The donations enabled The AU to deploy the largest known contingency of African healthcare workers to combat the spread of the deadly pandemic.

In 2015, Forbes Magazine named Masiyiwa in the 10 Most Powerful Men in Africa list for 2015, and the International Rescue Committee (IRC) awarded Masiyiwa the Freedom Award. The award is given annually to an individual who makes an extraordinary contribution towards supporting refugees and championing the causes of liberty, individual freedom, and dignity.

In 2019, he was awarded the Norman E. Borlaug World Food Prize Medallion and named one of the 100 Most Influential Africans by New African magazine. In 2020, he was named a JA Worldwide Global Business Hall of Fame Laureate.

In December 2020 Masiyiwa was named by Bloomberg as one of the 50 world's most influential people. He was also included in the list as one of the 100 Most Influential Africans of 2020 by the New African Magazine, and in Mail & Guardian's 100 Africans of the year for 2020. In May 2021, Masiyiwa was named by Fortune Magazine on the list of the World's 50 Greatest Leaders.

In 2022 he was named UK Spear's Magazine Entrepreneur of the Year.

Business career and interests 

Masiyiwa returned to his native Zimbabwe in 1984 after a 17-year absence. After working briefly as a telecoms engineer for the state-owned telephone company, he quit his job and set up his own company from saving amount of US$75 monthly from his salary

. He built a large electrical engineering business. The emergence of mobile cellular telephony led him to diversify into telecoms, but he soon ran into major problems when the Zimbabwean government of Robert Mugabe refused to give him a license to operate his business, known as Econet Wireless.

Masiyiwa appealed to the Constitutional Court of Zimbabwe, on the basis that the refusal constituted a violation of "freedom of expression". The Zimbabwean court,  ruled in his favour after a five-year legal battle, which took him to the brink of bankruptcy. The ruling, which led to the removal of the state monopoly in telecommunications, is regarded as one of the key milestones in opening the African telecommunications sector to private capital. The company's first cellphone subscriber was connected to the new network in 1998.

Masiyiwa listed Econet Wireless Zimbabwe in July 1998 on the local stock exchange as a gesture of thanks to reward the thousands of ordinary people who supported him during his long legal battles against the Zimbabwean government. Today, Econet Wireless Zimbabwe has gone on to become a major business that dominates the Zimbabwe economy. It is currently the second-largest company in Zimbabwe by market capitalisation.

In March 2000, fleeing persecution from the local authorities, Masiyiwa left Zimbabwe, never to return to the country, and moved first to South Africa, where he founded The Econet Wireless Group, a new and completely separate organisation to the listed Zimbabwean entity.

Some of the key businesses that he established with partners included Econet Wireless International, Econet Global, Mascom Wireless Botswana, Econet Wireless Nigeria (now Airtel Nigeria), Econet Satellite Services, Lesotho Telecom, Econet Wireless Burundi, Rwanda Telecom, Econet Wireless South Africa, Solarway, and Transaction Processing Systems (TPS). The company he created is known to have operations and investments across Africa plus the United Kingdom, Europe, US, Latin America, and New Zealand, United Arab Emirates, and China.

After more than ten years in South Africa, Masiyiwa moved to London. He still retains significant business interests in Africa.

Econet Global 

Econet Global (Econet) is a privately held international technology group with business operations and investments in more than 20 countries in Africa, Latin America, The United Kingdom, Europe, China, United Arab Emirates (UAE), and New Zealand. Two listed entities are its Zimbabwean subsidiary, Econet Wireless (1998) and Cassava Fintech (2018).

Masiyiwa owns over 50% of publicly traded Econet Wireless Zimbabwe.

Masiyiwa also has had interests in the United States of America (USA). He has partnered with one of America's leading telecoms entrepreneurs, John Stanton, in a venture called Trilogy International Partners, which built New Zealand's third mobile network operator known as "2 Degrees". 

One of Masiyiwa's most successful ventures is the London-based privately held Liquid Telecom Group (now Liquid Intelligent Technologies) Africa's largest satellite and fibre optic business spanning the continent with more than 100,000 kilometres of cable from Cape Town to Cairo and also connecting through many countries from east to west Africa.   

Other activities of Econet include digital enterprise networks, cybersecurity and cloud services, data centers, fintech, digital platforms, and renewable energy.

Philanthropy and humanitarian initiatives 

He has used his own family fortune to build one of the largest support programs for educating orphans in Africa. At any given time his family foundations have supported and educated more than 40,000 children. Masiyiwa and his wife are also a signatories of the Bill Gates and Warren Buffett initiative known as the Giving Pledge.

Masiyiwa has also been involved in supporting a diverse range of health issues including campaigns against HIV/AIDS, Cervical Cancer, malnutrition, EBOLA, and more recently, COVID-19. He is an avid environmentalist and together with Sir Richard Branson and others founded the environmental group, the Carbon War Room.

He  took over from former UN Secretary General Kofi Annan, the chairmanship of AGRA, an organisation that supports Africa's smallholder farmers. In 2019 he stepped down from AGRA and now serves as Chairman Emeritus. In 2013, he was appointed co-chair of Grow Africa, the investment forum for Africa's agriculture, which has helped mobilise over US$15 billion in investments for African agriculture.

Upon the cholera outbreak which happened in Zimbabwe in 2019, Strive Masiyiwa together with his wife donated a total of US$10m to fight against the disease. Moreover, he pledged US$60m to be used to build resilience against the disease.

In May 2020, he was appointed by South African President and African Union Chair Cyril Ramaphosa to serve as a Special Envoy to the African Union for COVID response where he served until early 2022. Later in 2022 Mr Masiyiwa led an AU task force working on Food Security in Africa and addressed this crisis at the US Africa Summit in Washington DC in December 2022. 

Together with his wife, they pledged $100m to establish a fund to invest in rural entrepreneurs in his home country. The two also started a non-profit organisation, Higherlife Foundation, which empowers disadvantaged children through education and creating opportunities for highly talented young people. Through one of the largest scholarship programmes in Africa, the Foundation pays the school fees for children in Zimbabwe, Lesotho and Burundi who they call their "history makers"

In January 2020 he paid for Zimbabwe's doctors to return to work after they struck to get paid. Masiyiwa agreed to pay each doctor a subsistence allowance of about $300 (£230) and provide them with transport to work, through a fund he set up. Most of the doctors on strike were earning less than $100 a month.

Personal life 
Masiyiwa is a Christian. He is married to Tsitsi, they have six children, and live in London, England. Masiyiwa owns two adjacent apartments atop the 29-storey Eldorado Tower at 300 Central Park in New York City, bought for US$24.5 million in 2016.

On 7 July 2022, Masiyiwa became the first black billionaire to enter the Sunday Times Rich List with a net worth of £1.6 billion.

References

External links 
 Masiyiwa profile page

Zimbabwean businesspeople
Zimbabwean philanthropists
1961 births
Giving Pledgers
21st-century philanthropists
Living people
Zimbabwean billionaires
Businesspeople in telecommunications
Alumni of the University of Wales
Fellows of the African Academy of Sciences
Honorary Fellows of the African Academy of Sciences